The Mosque of Mahmud Agha Kokonozi or New Bazaar Mosque is a mosque in Tirana, Central Albania, Albania. It is an Ottoman-era mosque built in 1750 and one of the few mosques that survived the communist dictatorship under the Hoxhaist regime.

In 1966, the Kokonozi Mosque was closed and transformed into a food storehouse, and later it was used as a tobacco store. The Kokonozi mosque was reopened on February 18, 1991.

See also
 Islam in Albania

Sources 

 History of the Mosque

Mosques in Tirana
Mosques completed in 1750
1750 establishments in the Ottoman Empire
Ottoman architecture in Albania
Ottoman mosques
Ottoman Albania